Kokkiliyar or Kokkili Aar is a river which originates in the Palni Hills of Tamil Nadu and runs for about  before joining the Kovanar river near Dindigul.

Rivers of Tamil Nadu
Rivers of India